Resistance is the fourth studio album by American deathcore band Winds of Plague. The album has been produced by Will Putney who has worked with bands such as Thy Art Is Murder and Stray from the Path.

Critical reception 

The album has garnered overall mixed reviews.

Track listing 

Notes
 The tracks "Snake Eyes" and "Looking for a Better Day" are different songs, with the latter starting at 3:32. However, on all releases of the album the two songs are combined into one track that is 6:22 long.

Personnel
Winds of Plague
 Jonathan "Johnny Plague" Cooke-Hayden – vocals
 Nick Eash – lead guitar
 Nick Piunno – rhythm guitar
 Andrew Glover – bass
 Brandon Galindo – drums, percussion
 Alana Potocnik – keyboards

Additional musicians
 Vincent Bennett of The Acacia Strain – guest vocals on track 3
 John Mishima – guest vocals on tracks 7, 8
 Jay Pepito of Reign Supreme – guest vocals on track 9
 Chris Fronzak of Attila – guest vocals on track 11

Additional personnel
 Will Putney – production, engineering, mixing, mastering
 Danny Morrietta – artwork

References

2013 albums
Winds of Plague albums
Century Media Records albums
Albums produced by Will Putney